The Union of Hong Kong Dockers (UHKD) is an affiliate of the Hong Kong Confederation of Trade Unions (HKCTU).

It started off a dock strike in the container berths owned by Hong Kong International Terminals (HIT), the subsidiary of Hutchison Port Holdings Trust (HPHT) and Hutchison Whampoa Limited (HWL) in 2013.

See also
 2013 Hong Kong dock strike
 Hong Kong Confederation of Trade Unions

References

Hong Kong Confederation of Trade Unions
Trade unions in Hong Kong
Port workers' trade unions
International Transport Workers' Federation
Trade unions established in 2006